A Love Letter to You 4 is the fourth commercial mixtape by American rapper Trippie Redd. It was released on November 22, 2019, by TenThousand Projects and Caroline Distribution. The project features guest appearances from Lil Mosey, Juice WRLD, YNW Melly, Chris King, Quan'ta, YoungBoy Never Broke Again, Smokepurpp, Tory Lanez, DaBaby, Lil Yachty, Pi'erre Bourne, Youv Dee, Lil Wop, and Mariah the Scientist. The deluxe edition was released on February 21, 2020, featuring additional guest appearances from Chance the Rapper, Russ, Young Thug, Lil Tecca, Lil Durk, G Herbo, and SahBabii.

Commercial performance
A Love Letter to You 4 debuted at number one on the US Billboard 200 chart, earning 104,000 album-equivalent units (including 14,000 copies as pure album sales) in its first week. This became Trippie Redd's first US number-one album and his fourth top ten album, following !, which debuted at number three in August 2019. The mixtape also accumulated a total of 125.9 million on demand streams from the set's songs that week. In its second week, the mixtape dropped to number three on the chart, earning an additional 54,000 units.

Track listing
Credits adapted from Tidal.

Credits adapted from Tidal.

Notes
 The track "Bad Vibes Forever" from the album of the same name, was originally included amongst a second version of the mixtape that Trippie Redd had uploaded but later removed, due to it appearing on Bad Vibes Forever two weeks later.
 The track "All For Me " also appears on the album Deadstar 2, without the voice memo ending by XXXTENTACION. 
 "How I Was Raised" also originally featured American rapper 9lokkNine, but did not appear on the final release.

Charts

Weekly charts

Year-end charts

Certifications

References

2019 mixtape albums
Trippie Redd albums
Albums produced by DJ Paul
Albums produced by Murda Beatz
Albums produced by Pi'erre Bourne

Albums produced by Nick Mira
Albums produced by Taz Taylor (record producer)
Albums produced by Wheezy